Khawand Toghay (14th-century), was a slave wife of Al-Nasir Mohammad Ibn Qala'un.

She was his slave before he freed her and married her. She was known for having a kind heart, and attending to all her slaves' needs after she was freed. She gave birth to Prince Anook.

She was noted as an influential woman in court decisions.

References

Egyptian slaves
13th-century Egyptian people
Medieval Egyptian women